Hans Schmidt was a German bobsledder who competed in the late 1930s. He won the bronze medal in the four-man event at the 1939 FIBT World Championships in Cortina d'Ampezzo.

References
Bobsleigh four-man world championship medalists since 1930

German male bobsledders
Possibly living people
Year of birth missing